Poghosagomer or Devedashy is a village that is, de facto, in the Martakert Province of the breakaway Republic of Artsakh; de jure, it is in the Kalbajar District of Azerbaijan, in the disputed region of Nagorno-Karabakh. The village has an ethnic Armenian-majority population, and also had an Armenian majority in 1989.

History 
During the Soviet period, the village was part of the Mardakert District of the Nagorno-Karabakh Autonomous Oblast.

Historical heritage sites 
Historical heritage sites in and around the village include khachkars from between the 11th and 13th centuries, the 12th/13th-century Holy Savior Monastery, a 12th/13th-century village and cemetery, a 13th-century chapel, and a 19th-century spring monument.

Economy and culture 
The population is mainly engaged in agriculture, animal husbandry, and mining. As of 2015, the village has a municipal building, a secondary school, two shops, and a medical centre. The community of Poghosagomer includes the village of Ghazarahogh.

Demographics 
The village had 157 inhabitants in 2005, and 242 inhabitants in 2015.

References

External links 
 

Populated places in Martakert Province
Populated places in Kalbajar District